Fahad Awadh (born 26 February 1985) is a Kuwaiti footballer who is a defender for the Kuwaiti Premier League club Al Kuwait.

International goals
Scores and results list Kuwait's goal tally first.

See also
 List of men's footballers with 100 or more international caps

References

1985 births
Living people
Kuwaiti footballers
Kuwait international footballers
2011 AFC Asian Cup players
2015 AFC Asian Cup players
Footballers at the 2006 Asian Games
Sportspeople from Kuwait City
FIFA Century Club
Association football defenders
Asian Games competitors for Kuwait
AFC Cup winning players
Kuwait SC players
Kuwait Premier League players